Cullum is a surname. Notable people with the surname include:

 Albert Cullum (1921–2003), American educator
 Ben Cullum, British musician
 George Washington Cullum (1809–1892), American Civil War general and Superintendent of the U.S. Military Academy
 JD Cullum (born 1966), American actor
 Jamie Cullum (born 1979), English pianist and songwriter
 Jim Cullum (1898–1948), Australian rules footballer
 Jim Cullum Jr. (1941–2019), American cornetist and bandleader
 John Cullum (born 1930), American actor and singer
 Kimberly (born 1981) and Kaitlin Cullum, American former child actors who are also sisters
 Leo Cullum (1942–2010), American cartoonist, father of Kimberly and Kaitlin Cullum
 Ridgwell Cullum (1867–1943), British writer of adventure novels
 Robert B. Cullum (1912–1981), American businessman and civic leader
 Thomas Gery Cullum (1741–1831), medical doctor, botanist, and antiquary